Belau Kanu Club is a Palauan association football club which plays in the Palau Soccer League, the top-level league in Palau. It was founded in 2012. Belau Kanu Club finished fifth in the Spring League and are  currently fourth in the Fall League as of November 2012.,

Players

2012 Squad

References

Football clubs in Palau